Talal Hamad (Arabic:طلال حمد) (born 7 March 1987) is an Emirati footballer who played in the Arabian Gulf League for Al-Nasr and Emirates Club.

External links

References

Emirati footballers
1987 births
Living people
Sharjah FC players
Al-Nasr SC (Dubai) players
Emirates Club players
Dibba FC players
UAE Pro League players
Association football defenders